Doris Boake Kerr (29 August 1889 at Summer Hill, Sydney – 5 June 1944 at Caulfield, Victoria) was a writer who published using the pseudonyms Capel Boake and Stephen Grey.
Her publishing career began with a story appearing in the Australasian in January 1916. Other stories and stories appeared in the Victorian School Paper. She wrote four novels: 
 Painted Clay (Melbourne, 1917, published by the Australasian Authors' Agency and reprinted by Virago London in 1986); 
 The Romany Mark (New South Wales Bookstall Co, 1923);
 The Dark Thread (Hutchinson London, 1936); and 
 The Twig is Bent, written with the aid of a Commonwealth literary grant but published posthumously (Sydney, 1946). 
Her subject matter included the options available to women in the early twentieth century, circus life, and early Melbourne history.

She used the pseudonym Stephen Grey when writing in collaboration with Bernard Cronin.

Capel Boake was also a poet: a collection of her verse was published posthumously in 1949 as The Selected Poems of Capel Boake.

References 

20th-century Australian novelists
Australian women novelists
1889 births
1944 deaths
20th-century Australian poets
20th-century Australian women writers
Pseudonymous women writers
19th-century Australian women
20th-century pseudonymous writers